The lucifer sheartail or lucifer hummingbird (Calothorax lucifer) is a medium-sized, 10 cm long, green hummingbird with a slightly curved bill and distinctive outward flare of its gorget feathers. Its habitat is in high-altitude areas of northern Mexico and southwestern United States. It winters in central Mexico.

Description

The male has an iridescent plumage, forked dark tail, green crown, long magenta gorget, and white underparts. The female is larger with duller plumage, pale throat and white or buff feathers underside, usually with crimson trim.

Distribution
The lucifer sheartail is distributed to deserts and arid areas with agave plants in the southwestern United States, from southwest Texas, extreme southwestern New Mexico to southeastern Arizona, and in central and northern Mexico. It is also found in the Madrean sky islands of the northern end of the Sierra Madre Occidental, Mexico. In winter, the birds migrate to central Mexico.

Diet
The diet consists mainly of nectar from agave and colorful desert flowers, spiders and small insects. Lucifer sheartails have a typical hummingbird flight style while feeding from flowers, catching insects in flight, and flying in straight lines to specific destinations for other food, the nest or for roosting. Males defend feeding areas from males, other females, and black-chinned hummingbirds.

Breeding and behavior
During courtship, males attract females by hovering high above the female, then dive with the wings or tail making a snap sound, then flying away with the tail feathers forked and making a different series of snapping sounds. The display lasts 30 to 45 seconds and may repeat several times an hour.

The female lays two white eggs in the small cup-like nest, having one or two broods per season. The egg incubation duration is about 15 days, and the chicks nest for about 23 days.

Status
A locally common species in its range, the lucifer sheartail is evaluated as stable and Least Concern on the IUCN Red List of Threatened Species.

Gallery

References

External links 

Photo-High Res--(Close-up)

lucifer sheartail
Birds of Mexico
lucifer sheartail
Native birds of the Southwestern United States